RTR may refer to:

Media
 Radiotelevisiun Svizra Rumantscha (previously Radio e Televisiun Rumantscha), a Swiss broadcasting company
 Reformed Theological Review, an Australian Protestant theological journal
 Return to Ravnica, a Magic the Gathering block
 Rome: Total Realism, a complete modification pack for the computer game Rome: Total War
 Rossiya 1 (previously RTR), a state-owned Russian television channel
 RTRFM, a not-for-profit, community radio station based in Perth, Western Australia

Military
 Royal Tank Regiment, of the British Army
 Royal Tasmania Regiment, of the Australian Army

Technology
 HP RTR, Reliable Transaction Router
 Real-time recovery from an IT infrastructure failure
 Remote transmission request on a CAN bus
 Unix RTR, a real-time operating system

Places
 Remedios T. Romualdez, Philippines
 Rochester railway station, Kent, England
 Russian Tea Room, New York City, US

Other uses
 Advanced and retracted tongue root (ATR and RTR) in speech
 Rent the Runway, an online dress rental service
 Rigs-to-Reefs, conversion of oil rigs into artificial reefs and related programs
 Rubber Tramp Rendezvous, an annual gathering of van-dwellers in Quartzsite, Arizona, US